Lancelot Gittens is a Guyanese Olympic middle-distance runner and hurdler. He represented his country in the men's 400 metres hurdles at the 1996 Summer Olympics, as well as in the men's 4 × 400 metres relay. He qualified to run the 400IH with a time of 47.9.  His clocked a time of 54.79 in the intermediate hurdles. His team's time was a 3:07.19 in the relay as he ran a split of 46.53. Gittens is currently an assistant principal at Eastside High School.

References

1974 births
Living people
Guyanese male hurdlers
Olympic athletes of Guyana
Athletes (track and field) at the 1996 Summer Olympics
20th-century Guyanese people
21st-century Guyanese people